Lombadan-e Pain (also Romanized as Lombadān-e Pā’īn; also known as Lombadān, Lombadān-e Soflá, Lompehdān, and Lompehdān-e Pā’īn) is a village in Howmeh Rural District, in the Central District of Deyr County, Bushehr Province, Iran. At the 2006 census, its population was 611, in 102 families.

References 

Populated places in Deyr County